The chestnut-rumped babbler (Stachyris maculata) is a species of bird in the family Timaliidae. It is found in Brunei, Indonesia, Malaysia, and Thailand. Its natural habitat is subtropical or tropical moist lowland forests. It is threatened by habitat loss.

References

Collar, N. J. & Robson, C. 2007. Family Timaliidae (Babblers)  pp. 70 – 291 in; del Hoyo, J., Elliott, A. & Christie, D.A. eds. Handbook of the Birds of the World, Vol. 12. Picathartes to Tits and Chickadees. Lynx Edicions, Barcelona.

chestnut-rumped babbler
Birds of Malesia
chestnut-rumped babbler
Taxonomy articles created by Polbot